Pierre Bottineau (January 1, 1817 – July 26, 1895) was a Minnesota frontiersman.

Known as the "Kit Carson of the Northwest," he was an integral part of the history and development of Minnesota and North Dakota. He was an accomplished surveyor and his many settlement parties founded cities all over Minnesota and North Dakota. Those settlements would become cities such as Osseo, Minnesota, and Maple Grove, Minnesota, northwest of the Twin Cities, as well as Breckenridge, Minnesota, and Wahpeton, North Dakota, on either side of the Red River of the North.

He also took part in the founding of Orono Village, Sherburne County, Minnesota, (later absorbed by Elk River, Minnesota) and the booming city of St. Anthony (later absorbed by Minneapolis). He was also a renowned diplomat and translator, earning him the nickname "The Walking Peace Pipe." He played a part in forging many treaties with Native American tribes. According to his obituary he spoke French, English, Dakota, Ojibwe, Cree, Mandan, and Winnebago.

Bottineau was born in a hunting camp on the buffalo trail near Grand Forks. His father Charles Bottineau was a French-Canadian, and his mother Marguerite Macheyquayzaince Ahdicksongab (Clear Sky Woman) was half Dakota and half Ojibwe of the Lake of the Woods band, and sister of the Pembina Ojibwe chief Misko-Makwa or Red Bear. 

Though Bottineau was nominally born in United States territory, control of the Upper Mississippi Valley had fallen to the British during the War of 1812. Even after the 1815 Treaty of Ghent returned the land to the United States, British and Canadian traders and the Native American tribes held all real control in the area. The U.S. government used Bottineau and others like him to settle the land and help establish American sovereignty. Most mixed race, or Métis, lived as outcasts to both White and Native societies, but Bottineau's invaluable services and exploits would make him a legend in his own time.  Upon his retirement, the United States Congress granted him a pension of $50 a month. He died in Red Lake Falls, Minnesota at the age of 78.

Bottineau County, North Dakota, and its county seat Bottineau, North Dakota, are named in his honor as well as the Pierre Bottineau Library and Bottineau Park in Minneapolis and Bottineau Blvd in Hennepin County, Minnesota. The Bottineau LRT line has been proposed in Minneapolis. He was the grandfather of Native American rights activist and suffragist Marie Louise Bottineau Baldwin.

References

Sources 
 The Bottineau Family Website 
 The Bottineau Boulevard Partnership
 Minnesota Historical Society
 City of Osseo, Minnesota Website

1817 births
1895 deaths
American Métis people
American people of French-Canadian descent
American folklore
American pioneers
Pre-statehood history of Minnesota
Pre-statehood history of North Dakota
People of Minnesota Territory
Indigenous languages of the Americas